Keenan Girod Lewis (born May 17, 1986) is a former American football cornerback. He was drafted by the Pittsburgh Steelers in the third round of the 2009 NFL Draft, and also played for the New Orleans Saints. He played college football at Oregon State.

High school
Lewis attended O. Perry Walker High School in New Orleans, Louisiana and was schoolmates and teammates with NFL wide receiver Mike Wallace. He was a three-year starter for head coach Terry Wilson. He made 75 tackles as a senior with four quarterback sacks and seven interceptions, also returned five punts for 180 yards and five kickoffs for 150 yards in 2003. Was named first-team all-metro and all-league as a senior. He recorded 71 tackles with two interceptions as a junior and 54 tackles as a sophomore.

College career
Lewis played for Oregon State between 2004-2008. After redshirting as a freshman in 2004, he started all 11 games and ended the year with 98 tackles, fourth on the team in 2005. He led the team for pass breakups with 11. He made the College Football News Third-team Freshman All-American and honorable mention by the Sporting News. In 2006, Lewis made 22 tackles for the season, was second on the team with eight pass breakups, and also accounted for a sack and two tackles for loss. Lewis finished off his career as one of the most physical corners in the, then, Pac-10 conference.

Professional career

Pittsburgh Steelers
The Pittsburgh Steelers selected Lewis in the third round (96th overall) of the 2009 NFL Draft.

On June 12, 2009, the Pittsburgh Steelers signed Lewis to a three-year, $1.66 million contract.

New Orleans Saints
On March 14, 2013, the New Orleans Saints signed Lewis to a five-year, $26.3 million contract that includes $10.5 million guaranteed and a signing bonus of $6 million. On November 26, 2015 Lewis was placed on injured reserve with a leg injury, ending his season. Lewis had been slowly recovering from January 2016 hip surgery. He started training camp on the physically unable to perform list, and although the team activated him from PUP on August 3, 2016, he practiced just one day and had been sidelined ever since.  On August 19, 2016, Lewis was released by the Saints.

Free agency
On April 25, 2016, it was reported that the Pittsburgh Steelers met with Keenan Lewis and explored a possible agreement with the free agent. He underwent an MRI and a physical and it was discovered Lewis was still dealing with the hip injury that caused his release from the Saints. The Steelers elected not to sign him.

On April 29, 2017, the Pittsburgh Steelers again hosted Lewis on a visit to look into the possibility signing the free agent, but again decided against it.

References

External links
Oregon State Beavers bio
Pittsburgh Steelers bio

1986 births
Living people
Players of American football from New Orleans
American football cornerbacks
Oregon State Beavers football players
Pittsburgh Steelers players
New Orleans Saints players